The Battle of the Pyramids, also known as the Battle of Embabeh, was a major engagement fought on 21 July 1798, during the French Invasion of Egypt. The battle took place near the village of Embabeh, across the Nile River from Cairo, but was named by Napoleon after the Great Pyramid of Giza visible nearly 9 miles away.

After capturing Alexandria and crossing the desert, the French army, led by General Napoleon Bonaparte, scored a decisive victory against the main army of the local Mamluk rulers, wiping out almost the entire Ottoman army located in Egypt. It was the first battle where Bonaparte personally devised and employed the divisional square tactic to great effect. The deployment of the French brigades into these massive rectangular formations repeatedly threw back multiple cavalry charges of the Mamluks.

The victory effectively sealed the French conquest of Egypt as Murad Bey salvaged the remnants of his army, chaotically fleeing to Upper Egypt. French casualties amounted to roughly 300, but Ottoman and Mamluk casualties soared into the thousands. Napoleon entered Cairo after the battle and created a new local administration under his supervision. The battle exposed the fundamental military and political decline of the Ottoman Empire throughout the past century, especially compared to the rising power of France.

Prelude
After landing in Ottoman-controlled Egypt and capturing Alexandria on 2 July 1798, the French army led by General Bonaparte marched down the desert toward Cairo. They met the forces of the ruling Mamluks nine miles (15 kilometres) from the Pyramids and only four miles (6 kilometres) from Cairo. The Mamluk forces were commanded by two Georgian mamluks, Murad Bey and Ibrahim Bey, and had a force of powerful and highly trained cavalry at their command as well as fellahin militia acting as infantry.
On 13 July after French scouts located Murad's encampment, Bonaparte ordered an advance toward the enemy's forces, engaging them during the brief battle of Chobrakit. After the destruction of their flagship by French field artillery the Mamluks retreated instead of engaging, the skirmish ending in a minor French victory.

Battle
On 21 July, after marching all night, the French caught up with the Ottoman force in the vicinity of the village of Embabeh, after one hour rest the men were ordered to get ready for battle. Bonaparte ordered an advance on Murad's army with each of the five divisions of his army organised into hollow rectangles with cavalry and baggage at the center and cannon at the corners. Bonaparte exhorted his troops to remain steady and keep their ranks closed up when facing the Mameluke cavalry.

The French divisions advanced south in echelon, with the right flank leading and the left flank protected by the Nile. From right to left, Bonaparte posted the divisions of Louis Charles Antoine Desaix, Jean-Louis-Ébénézer Reynier, Charles-François-Joseph Dugua, Honoré Vial and Louis André Bon. In addition, Desaix sent a small detachment to occupy the nearby village of Biktil, just to the west. Murad anchored his right flank on the Nile at the village of Embabeh, which was fortified and held with infantry and some ancient cannons, his left flank was anchored on the village of Biktil, where the rest of his cannons were placed there to protect from French flanking movements. His Mamluk cavalry deployed in the center, between these villages. The other Mamluk army, commanded by Ibrahim Bey, stood across the Nile and watched the events unfold, unable to cross and intervene. Murad Bey's original plan was to repulse the French attacks on his fortified flanks, and then attack their demoralized center. 

The Mamluks, being a force that is still largely feudal and medieval in all of its practical characteristics, including its military, were completely at odds with the modern standing French army. The majority of the Egyptian army was drafted Fellahin (peasants), its maw was the Mamluk horse. An episode during the battle that demonstrated the rift between the armies occurred when a Mamluk rider, dressed in heavy armour, rode to within only a few steps from the French lines and demanded a duel. The French responded with gunfire. 

  

Napoleon ordered Desaix's square to advance to the right (towards the Egyptian center) and the rest of his squares to the left (in the direction of Embebeh), Murad Bey saw an opportunity and ordered his defterdar Ayyub Bey to attack the French squares, at about 15:30, the Mamluk cavalry hurled itself at the French without warning. The divisional squares of Desaix, Reynier and Dugua held firm and repelled the horsemen with point-blank musket and artillery fire. Unable to make an impression on the French formations, some of the frustrated Mamluks rode off to attack Desaix's detached force. This was also a failure. Meanwhile, nearer the river, Bon's division deployed into attack columns and charged Embabeh. Breaking into the village, the French routed the garrison. Trapped against the river, many of the Mamluks and infantry tried to swim to safety, and hundreds drowned. The French reported a loss of 29 killed and 260 wounded. Murad's losses were far heavier, perhaps as many as 10,000 including 3,000 of the elite Mamluk cavalry, and his defterdar Ayyub Bey was also killed in the battle. Murad Bey himself was also wounded in the cheek with a hit from a saber. Murad escaped to Upper Egypt with his 3,000 surviving cavalry, where he carried out an active guerrilla campaign before being defeated by Desaix in late 1799.

Aftermath
Upon hearing news of the defeat of their legendary cavalry, the waiting Mamluk armies in Cairo dispersed to Syria, Bonaparte entered the conquered capital of Egypt on 24 July. On 11 August French forces caught up with Ibrahim Bey inflicting on him a crushing defeat at Salalieh. 

After the Battle of Pyramids, Napoleon instituted French administration in Cairo and suppressed the subsequent rebellions violently. Although Napoleon tried to co-opt the local Egyptian ulema, scholars like Al-Jabarti ignorant of the advances that had taken place in Europe and understanding little of France’s so-called Republic, poured scorn on the ideas and cultural ways of the French. Despite their cordial proclamations to the natives, with some French soldiers even converting to Islam in order to take Muslim wives, clerics like Abdullah al-Sharqawi, who headed Napoleon’s Cairo government or divan, later described the French as: "‘materialist, libertine philosophers … [who] deny the resurrection, and the afterlife, and … [the] prophets" while for the French, mathematician Joseph Fourier regretted that "the Muslim religion would on no account permit the development of the mind".

The Battle of the Pyramids signalled the beginning of the end of seven centuries of Mamluk rule in Egypt. Despite this auspicious beginning, British Admiral Horatio Nelson's victory in the Battle of the Nile ten days later effectively ended Napoleon's ambitions in Egypt.

Cultural depictions
The battle was depicted by François-André Vincent in a sketch, and by various other artists.

See also
 Military career of Napoleon Bonaparte

Notes

References

Sources

Further reading
 Cole, Juan, Napoleon's Egypt: Invading the Middle East Palgrave Macmillan, 2007. 
 Herold, J. Christopher, Bonaparte in Egypt - London, Hamish Hamilton, 1962.
 Herold, J. Christopher, The Age of Napoleon. New York, American Heritage, 1963.
 Moorehead, Alan, The Blue Nile New York, Harper & Row, 1962.

External links

French campaign in Egypt and Syria
Battles of the French Revolutionary Wars
Conflicts in 1798
Military history of Egypt
1798 in Egypt
Battles involving the Ottoman Empire
Battles involving France
Napoleon
Battles inscribed on the Arc de Triomphe